David Prior is an American film director, screenwriter, producer, and editor best known for his work on the cult horror film The Empty Man, and television series such as Voir and Guillermo del Toro's Cabinet of Curiosities. He is also responsible for directing and producing several making-of documentaries for films, most notably the works of David Fincher and Michael Bay.

Career
After directing documentaries of various David Fincher films for over ten years, Prior helmed his first independent short film AM1200 in 2008. In February 2016, he was hired to write and direct his feature film debut, the supernatural horror film The Empty Man, based on the graphic novel of the same name from Boom! Studios. In September 2021, he was hired to direct an episode on the Netflix series Guillermo del Toro's Cabinet of Curiosities. In December 2021, he directed, co-created, and executive produced Fincher's Netflix series Voir.

Filmography 

Television

References

External links
 

21st-century American male writers
21st-century American screenwriters
American film directors
American film editors
American male screenwriters
Living people
Place of birth missing (living people)
Year of birth missing (living people)
Horror film directors